Green Key Global is an international eco-label which certifies hotels and venues operating in 20 countries. The industry-run group is based in Ottawa and has over 1,800 participating facilities. The system is based on self-reporting, with facilities receiving a certification between one and five keys.

The organization collaborates with other leaders in the hospitality sector environmental stewardship, including EcoStay Certified and Greenview, to encourage hoteliers to join forces in meaningful sustainability. The partnership enables property owners and managers to fund important conservation projects, measure their progress, and be a part of a shared environmental legacy of nature and beauty. Through its partnership with Greenview, EcoStay Certified offers an innovative portal system that makes it easy for member hotels to track, measure, and improve their sustainability and social responsibility performance.

References

Sustainable tourism
Environmental standards
Organizations based in Ottawa